Bemarivo Reserve is a wildlife reserve in the north-west of Madagascar. The reserve is known for its fauna especially endemic birds.

Geography
The Bemarivo River is a tributary of the Sofia River and flows permanently during the dry season unlike the small tributaries of the Marotondro and Ampandra Rivers which are seasonal. The main vegetation is dense, dry deciduous forest, dominated by trees of Cordyla, Dalbergia, Diospyros, Eugenia, Grewia, Cryptocarya agathophylla and Sideroxylon species. Outside the forest, there is secondary savanna with Bismarckia palms, and Tsimanjonotsy and Ranovoribe lakes and marshes. The Sakalava are the dominant ethnic group.

Flora and fauna
The reserve has an impressive number of endemic birds with over twenty-three recorded. Altogether there are seventy-three species of birds, twenty species of reptiles and fifteen species of mammals (including six species of lemurs) are known in this reserve, as well as twenty-four species of reptiles and 194 species of plants. The wetlands are the biggest attraction for birds which include the Madagascar fish eagle (Haliaeetus vociferoides) which is critically endangered and Bernier's teal  (Anas bernieri) which is listed as endangered by the International Union for Conservation of Nature (IUCN). Reptiles found in the reserve include the Nile crocodile (Crocodylus niloticus) and the Madagascar Ground Boa (Acrantophis madagascariensis).

Slash-and-burn agriculture is the main threat in the reserve along with fires.

See also
 List of national parks of Madagascar

References

External links
 Madagascar National Parks

1956 establishments in Madagascar
Melaky
Special reserves of Madagascar
Protected areas established in 1956
Madagascar dry deciduous forests
Important Bird Areas of Madagascar